John Borowski is an American independent filmmaker and author. The focus of his work has been on late nineteenth and early twentieth century serial killers, initially in a trilogy of documentaries on American criminals, more recently on particular international criminals, on the commerce that has grown up around such crimes, and on other niche artists.

Early life
After receiving his B.A. from Columbia College Chicago’s film program, Borowski freelanced as an editor and cinematographer. Director Willy Laszlo chose Borowski to edit every headlining film for the Chicago Short Comedy Film and Video Festival from 1999 to 2003. In 2004, Borowski’s independently produced first film, H.H. Holmes: America’s First Serial Killer, was distributed on DVD in North America by Facets Video. For the voice of the narrator, Borowski chose Tony Jay, the voice of villain Judge Claude Frollo in Disney’s Hunchback of Notre Dame. Holmes received an unprecedented amount of press, being covered by television (CBS News, Wild Chicago), print (Variety, LA Weekly, Chicago Sun-Times, Ain't It Cool News, Philadelphia Weekly, Chicago Magazine), and radio (Mancow Show, Deadpit Radio). The historical interest in Holmes was reflected in the lectures Borowski delivered to The Chicago Historical Society, Indiana State University, and St. Xavier University. The Strange Case of Dr. H.H. Holmes is an illustrated book published by Borowski containing three primary source books about the Holmes case and Holmes’ complete confession. H.H. Holmes has been distributed to over a dozen countries worldwide.

Career

Film Work
Borowski's films are distributed internationally on DVD, television, and streaming. His "historical horror" trilogy of documentary films focus on late nineteenth and early twentieth century serial killers. Borowski directed a trilogy, based on America serial killers, H.H. Holmes: America's First Serial Killer (2004), Albert Fish: In Sin He Found Salvation (2007), and Carl Panzram: The Spirit of Hatred and Vengeance (2012) and Serial Killer Culture (2014) which examines the reasons why artists and collectors are fascinated by serial killers. .

Borowski received the 2003 award for Best Director for H.H. Holmes from the Midwest Independent Film Festival, and the film was voted the Best Horror Documentary at the 2004 Screamfest Horror Film Festival. The film has been featured on PBS.

Carl Panzram featured John DiMaggio as the voice of title criminal and murderer, Carl Panzram. Locations for the film included the maximum security prisons of Leavenworth Penitentiary and Clinton Correction Facility, and made use of Panzram's handwritten autobiographical papers at San Diego State University; Carl Panzram received the director's choice award at the 2012 Chicago Horror Film Festival.

Borowski has produced and directed the short films: Mime Time (2013), Rough Crowd (2014), and The Portrait (2015).

In 2014, Borowski released Serial Killer Culture, a film which examines the reasons why artists and collectors are fascinated by serial killers. Through music, painting, filmmaking, writing, and collecting, thirteen individuals are interviewed about creating art and searching for murderous artifacts. As a follow up to the film, Serial Killer Culture TV was released in 2017. The TV show explores the similar themes including a Jonestown Survivor and how Ripley's Believe It Or Not! acquired the head of German serial killer Peter Kurten.

In addition, Borowski served as an associate producer on the feature Toro Loco (2010), by Chilean filmmaker Patricio Valladares.

Author
Borowski has written and published the books: The Strange Case of Dr. H.H. Holmes (2005), Albert Fish: In His Own Words (2014), and The Ed Gein File (2016), which contain case files from the true crime cases.

Music videos
 Think I'm in Love, by the Das Bruce.
 Mr. Fish, by the Swedish Band, Sparzanza.,
 The Sea/Cellophane, by Dubwitch

Projects in Production
Borowski is currently in post-production on Bloodlines: The Art and Life of Vincent Castiglia, to be released in 2017.

Jesse Pomeroy: The Boston Boy Fiend is a feature documentary film in production, which focuses  on the infamous 14 year old boy killer.

References in published works
Borowski’s work was featured in The Documentary Moviemaking Course: The Starter Guide to Documentary Filmmaking by K.J. Lindenmuth, and in a self-published work, Murderabilia and True Crime Collecting, by S.F. Scouller.

The Swedish Band, Sparzanza used the narration by Tony Jay in the Borowski movie Albert Fish in their song, Mr. Fish.

Guest appearances
Borowski was a special guest speaker at the 2012 Indie Horror Fest.

Personal life
Borowski currently resides in Chicago.

Filmography

As director
H. H. Holmes: America's First Serial Killer (2004).
Albert Fish (2007).
Carl Panzram: The Spirit of Hatred and Vengeance (2012).
The John Wayne Gacy Murders: Life and Death in Chicago (2020)
Serial Killer Culture TV (2017)
 Bloodlines: The Art and Life of Vincent Castiglia (2017).

Other roles
 Toro Loco (2010), by Chilean filmmaker Patricio Valladares, as producer.

Awards
Midwest Independent Film Festival 2003 - Best Director: John Borowski for H. H. Holmes: America's First Serial Killer.
Screamfest Horror Film Festival 2004 - Best Horror Documentary: H. H. Holmes: America's First Serial Killer
Chicago Horror Film Festival 2012 - Director's Choice Award: Carl Panzram: The Spirit of Hatred and Vengeance.
Frozen Film Festival 2015 - Best Overall Film: The Portrait.

Further reading
 Bears Fonte, 2014, "Murderbelia and the Serial Killer Culture: An Interview With John Borowski," at AMFM MAGAGINE (online), November 20, 2014, see , accessed 15 May 2015.
 Harold Schechter, Lee Mellor, Michael Newton, Kim Cresswell, Aaron Elliott, Robert Hoshowsky (Lee Mellor, Ed., William Cook, Illustr.), 2014, "Unsolved in North America," Serial Killer Quarterly, Vol.1 No.3, pp. 8–10, Grinning Man Press, see , accessed 15 May 2015.
 Matt Forster, 2014, "Movie Review: John Borowski’s "Serial Killer Culture," TuffGnarl (online), August 30, 2014, see , accessed 15 May 2015.

References

Year of birth missing (living people)
Living people
American film directors
American male screenwriters
Artists from Chicago
Screenwriters from Illinois